Cam Washes is a  biological Site of Special Scientific Interest west of Wicken in Cambridgeshire.

This site on the banks of the River Cam is composed of pastures which are seasonally flooded. It is described by Natural England as an important site for wintering and breeding wildfowl and waders. Breeding birds include snipe, common redshank, gadwall, Eurasian teal and northern shoveler.

There is access from the Fen Rivers Way, which goes through the site.

References

External links
The British Trust for Ornithology (2006) A survey and assessment of the birds of the Cam Washes and Berry Fen SSSIs, Cambridgeshire, focussing on breeding and wintering waterbirds

Sites of Special Scientific Interest in Cambridgeshire
Wicken, Cambridgeshire